The Indiana State League was an Independent level minor league baseball league that played in the  1888, 1890, 1896 and 1900 seasons. The Indiana State League consisted of teams based exclusively in Indiana. The Indiana State League permanently folded after the 1900 season.

History
The Indiana State League first began minor league play in 1888. The league began play on May 11, 1888 as an Independent six–team league with members Elkhart, Fort Wayne, Frankfort, Lafayette, Logansport Oilers and Marion. After the season began, the Lafayette, Indiana franchise withdrew on June 12, 1888 to join the Central Interstate League and were replaced by the South Bend Green Stockings. The 1888 Indiana State League folded mid–season, on June 18, 1888. The Logansport Oilers were in 1st place with a 10–3 record when the Indiana State League stopped play in 1888.

The Indiana State League expanded and played as an eight–team league in 1890 under league president McCullough. The 1890 member teams were Anderson, Bluffton, Elkhart, Fort Wayne Reds, Kokomo, Marion/Logansport, Muncie and Peru. During the season, Marion relocated to Logansport on July 6, 1890. Elkhart disbanded June 26, 1890 and Bluffton disbanded June 30, 1890. Anderson finished 1st in the league standings with a 38–25 record.

The 1896 Indiana State League formed as a six–team Independent level league. The Logansport Ottos were the 1896 league champions with a 4–2 record under manager M.A Ryan. The league began play on July 26, 1896 and the season ended on August 4, 1896.

In the final season of play, the Indiana State League reformed as a six–team league for the 1900 season. The president was Edward E. Hill. During the season, Elmwood moved from Logansport. Elwood and Muncie both disbanded on June 10, 1900, causing the entire league to fold. The Wabash Farmers were in 1st place with a 19–9 record when the league disbanded. Anderson and Marion joined Interstate League in August, 1900.

Cities represented 
Anderson, Indiana: Anderson (1890, 1896); Anderson Tigers (1900) 
Bluffton, Indiana: Bluffton (1890)
Elkhart, Indiana: Elkhart (1888, 1890)
Elwood, Indiana: Elmwood (1896); Elwood Wanderers (1900) 
Fort Wayne, Indiana: Fort Wayne (1888); Fort Wayne Reds (1890) 
Frankfort, Indiana: Frankfort (1888)
Kokomo, Indiana: Kokomo (1890); Kokomo Blues (1896); Kokomo Wildcats (1900)
Lafayette, Indiana: Lafayette (1888)
Logansport, Indiana: Logansport Oilers (1888); Logansport Ottos (1896); Logansport (1900) 
Marion, Indiana: Marion (1888); Marion Veterans (1900) 
Muncie, Indiana: Muncie (1890, 1900)
Peru, Indiana: Peru (1890)
South Bend, Indiana: South Bend Green Stockings (1888)
Wabash, Indiana: Wabash Farmers (1900)

Standings & statistics
 1888 Indiana State League 

 1890 Indiana State League 

 1896 Indiana State League 
 
 1900 Indiana State League

External links
 Baseball Reference

References

Defunct minor baseball leagues in the United States
Baseball in Indiana
Baseball leagues in Indiana
1888 establishments in the United States
1900 disestablishments in the United States
Sports leagues established in 1888
Sports leagues disestablished in 1900